Aanandham Paramaanandham is a 1977 Indian Malayalam-language comedy film directed by I. V. Sasi. The film stars Kamal Haasan, Unni Mary, Chandrakala and Ravikumar. The film has musical score by G. Devarajan. It is a remake of the 1967 Tamil film Anubavi Raja Anubavi. This is considered as the only comedy movie of I. V. Sasi.

Cast 

Kamal Haasan as Babu, Shekarankutty 
Unni Mary (Deepa) as Raji
Chandrakala as Rekha
Ravikumar as Raju
Roja Ramani as Ammini
Sukumari as Babu & Shekharankutty's mother
KPAC Lalitha as Lalitha
Bahadoor as Chandrashekharan
Janardanan as Inspector Raghavan
Kunchan as secretary
Kuthiravattam Pappu as Pappu
Paravoor Bharathan as Advocate Sadashivan
T. P. Madhavan as Advocate
Uma Bharani
P. R. Menon as Manager Menon

Production 
Anandam Paramanandam film directed by I. V. Sasi, produced by Jameela and Leela under production banner Jaleela Enterprises. The film dialogue written by A. Sheriff. This film was shot in black-and-white. It was given an "U" (Unrestricted) certificate by the Central Board of Film Certification without cuts.

Soundtrack 
The music was composed by G. Devarajan and the lyrics were written by Sreekumaran Thampi.

References

External links 
 

1977 films
1970s Malayalam-language films
Indian comedy films
Twins in Indian films
Malayalam remakes of Tamil films
Films directed by I. V. Sasi